Plaza Amador is a Panamanian football club based in Panama City, that currently plays in Liga Panameña de Fútbol. It is the oldest team in Panama.

History
C.D Plaza Amador was founded in 1955 by Panamanian sports legend León Cocoliso Tejada (1927–1982).  Under Tejada's leadership, the club relied heavily on developing and training players (rather than high-profile signings).  After Tejada's's death, new directors Andrés Villa, Daniel Vàsquez and Enrique Cajar led the club back to the highest level of Panamanian football.  They won the district title, the COPA JVC, and in 1988 claimed their first ever ANAPROF championship.  Amador proceeded to win titles in 1990 and 1992.  After a long drought, they claimed victory in Apertura 2002 (as well as that year's grand final), Clausura 2005 (as well as that year's grand final), and Clausura 2016.

Emblems

The club's colors are the three colors of the Panamanian flag: red, white and blue. Plaza Amador was named after the square plaza located in the Amador neighborhood of El Chorrillo borough.

Players

Current squad

Notable players

Honours
Liga Panameña de Fútbol:  7
1988, 1990, 1992, 2002, 2005, 2016 Clausura, 2021 Apertura
Copa JVC: 1
1986

International Participations

CONCACAF Champions League: 1 appearance
2016-17 – Group Stage
CONCACAF League: 1 appearance
2017 – Semifinals
CONCACAF Cup Winners Cup: 4 appearances
1988 : Preliminary Round
1989 : Second Round
1991 : First Round
1993 : First Round
UNCAF Interclub Cup: 3 appearances
2001 : First Round
2004 : Quarterfinals
2006 : First Round

Historical list of coaches

 Milton Palacios (1991)
 Carlos Collazo (1992–1993)
 Ricardo Buitrago (1996)
 Américo Bravo (–Aug 02)
 Sergio Giovagnolli (Sept 2002–??)
 Fernando Arnulfo Bolívar (2005)
 Ricardo Buitrago (2005)
 Mauricio Álvarez (Jan 2006–)
 Jair Palacios
 Leopoldo Lee (–Jan 2010)
 Marcos Casagrande (Jan 2010)
 Jair Palacios (Feb 2010 – Aug 2010)
 Rubén Guevara (Aug 2010 – Aug 2011)
 Marcelo Javier Ainstein (Aug 2011 – Apr 2012)
 Juan Carlos Cubillas (Jan 2012 – Feb 2012)
 Leonicio de la Flor (May 2012 – Dec 2012)
 Carlos García Cantarero (Jan 2013 – Mar 2013)
 Richard Parra (Mar 2013 – May 13)
 Mike Stump (May 2013 – Nov 2014)
 Juan Carlos García (Jan 2015 – Dec 2015)
 Jair Palacios (Jan 2016 – Nov 2017)
 Juan Carlos García (Nov 2017 – Nov 2018)
 Javier Álvarez Arteaga (Dec 2018 – Jul 2019)
 Mike Stump (Jul 2019 – 2020)
 Jorge Dely Valdés (Oct 2020 – Current)

References

External links

Official Site

Football clubs in Panama
Association football clubs established in 1955
Panama City
1955 establishments in Panama